Brandon Schools may refer to:

Brandon School, a school in California's Goleta Union School District
Brandon Zone, a zone of Mississippi's Rankin County School District
Brandon High School (Grades 9-12) 
Brandon Middle School (Grades 6-8) 
Brandon Elementary School (Grades 3-5) 
Brandon School District in Minnesota
Brandon Valley School District in South Dakota 
Brandon School District (Michigan) in Michigan
Brandon High School (Michigan)
Rosendale-Brandon School District in Wisconsin
Brandon School Division is a school division in Brandon, Manitoba, Canada
Brandon High School (Florida) of Brandon, Hillsborough County, Florida
Brandon Gate Public School of Peel District School Board